Toraja-Sadan (also Toraja, Sadan, South Toraja) is an Austronesian language spoken in South Sulawesi, Indonesia. It shares the name Tae with East Toraja. Most of the Toraja language mapping was done by Dutch missionaries working in Sulawesi, such as Nicolaus Adriani and Hendrik van der Veen.

References

Further reading

 
  Accessed 21 Jan. 2023.

South Sulawesi languages
Languages of Indonesia
Torajan people